Vanyar (also Romanized as Vanyār, Vanayār, and Vaneyār; also known as Banyār) is a village in Mavazekhan-e Sharqi Rural District, Khvajeh District, Heris County, East Azerbaijan Province, Iran. At the 2006 census, its population was 64, in 14 families.

References 

Populated places in Heris County